Aubree Munro Watson (born October 4, 1993) is an American, former college softball player, medal-winning Olympian, professional softball catcher. She played college softball for the Florida Gators where she won two NCAA Championships, and played professionally for the USSSA Pride of the National Pro Fastpitch (NPF). She is currently a member of the United States women's national softball team, and represented Team USA at the 2020 Summer Olympics and won a silver medal.

College career
Munro won back-to-back NCAA Championships with the Florida Gators in 2014 and 2015. During her junior year in 2015, she became one of nine Gators to record a perfect fielding percentage (minimum 50 chances) in a season. She did not made an error in 354 chances behind the plate. During her final two seasons she committed just one error in 874 chances and made only four miscues in 1,423 chances during her career, which tied for second in program history.

Professional career
Following her collegiate career, Munro was drafted 39th overall by USSSA Pride in the 2016 NPF Draft. She signed with the team on July 20, 2016. She was released by USSSA Pride prior to the 2017 season following one season with the team.

Team USA
Munro has been a member of the United States women's national softball team since 2016. At the 2016 World Cup of Softball, she hit .200 (2-for-10) with three RBI and won silver. At the 2016 Women's Softball World Championship, she hit .400 (4-for-10) with one run scored and won gold. At the 2017 World Cup of Softball she hit .143 (1-7) with one RBI and won silver. At the 2018 Women's Softball World Championship, she hit .389 (7-for-18) with three home runs, eight RBI and seven runs scored and won gold. At the 2019 Pan American Games, she hit .143 (2-for-14) with one home run, three RBI and one run scored and won gold. She represented the United States at the 2020 Summer Olympics and won a silver medal. Team USA was defeated by Team Japan for the Gold medal on July 27, 2021, and Munro was shutout at the plate.

References

Living people
1993 births
Florida Gators softball players
Pan American Games gold medalists for the United States
Pan American Games medalists in softball
People from Brea, California
Softball players at the 2019 Pan American Games
Softball players from California
USSSA Pride players
Medalists at the 2020 Summer Olympics
Olympic medalists in softball
Olympic silver medalists for the United States in softball
Olympic softball players of the United States
Softball players at the 2020 Summer Olympics
Medalists at the 2019 Pan American Games